Wyck is a neighbourhood in Maastricht, Netherlands comprising the eastern bank of the Meuse in the city's historic centre.

Areas 
The neighbourhood consists of three distinct parts:
 Oud-Wyck ("Old Wyck"), comprising the oldest built-up area, until 1867 surrounded by Maastricht's Medieval city wall.
 Stationsbuurt ("Station Neighbourhood"), the area west of the railway and Maastricht railway station, predominantly dating from the 19th century.
 Céramique, on the former factory grounds of Société Céramique south of Old Wyck, redeveloped during the 1990s/2000s. The area consists mostly of new-built apartment blocks, designed by international architects, and some restored factory buildings. The Bonnefantenmuseum, designed by Aldo Rossi, is a major landmark along the Meuse river. Though sometimes seen as a neighbourhood in itself, Céramique is officially part of Wyck.

Notable features
 Beluga (restaurant)
 Bonnefantenmuseum
 Centre Céramique, Maastricht's main public library

Impressions

Location

Neighbourhoods of Maastricht